Bostrychia is a genus of ibises in the family Threskiornithidae. Member species are found in many countries throughout Africa.

It contains the following five species:

Conservation 
Four of these species are evaluated as Least Concern status, but the dwarf olive ibis is Critically Endangered according to the IUCN.

References

 
 
Bird genera
 
Taxa named by George Robert Gray
Taxonomy articles created by Polbot